Zener can refer to:

Zener diode, a type of electronic diode
Zener effect, a type of electrical breakdown which is employed in a Zener diode
Zener pinning, the influence of a dispersion of fine particles on the movement of low- and high angle grain boundaries through a polycrystalline material
Clarence Zener, the American physicist after whom the diode, effect, and pinning are named
Karl Zener, the American psychologist after whom the cards are named
Zener cards, cards used to conduct experiments for extra-sensory perception